Nico Georgiadis (born 22 January 1996) is a Swiss chess player. He holds the title of Grandmaster, which FIDE awarded him in 2017.

Chess career
Born in Bülach, Georgiadis earned his international master title in 2013 and his grandmaster title in 2017.

References

External links

Nico Georgiadis chess games at 365Chess.com

1996 births
Living people
Chess grandmasters
People from Bülach
Swiss chess players
Swiss people of Greek descent